New London Township is one of the nineteen townships of Huron County, Ohio, United States. As of the 2010 census the population of the township was 3,268, down from 3,440 in 2000. As of 2010, 807 of the population lived in the unincorporated portion of the township.

Geography
Located on the eastern edge of the county, it borders the following townships:
Clarksfield Township - north
Brighton Township, Lorain County - northeast corner
Rochester Township, Lorain County - east
Troy Township, Ashland County - southeast corner
Ruggles Township, Ashland County - south
Greenwich Township - southwest corner
Fitchville Township - west
Hartland Township - northwest corner

The village of New London is located in southern New London Township.

Name and history
New London Township was organized in 1817. It was named after New London, Connecticut, the hometown of many of its pioneer settlers. The township is included in the category of the original Ohio Firelands.

It is the only New London Township statewide.

Government
The township is governed by a three-member board of trustees, who are elected in November of odd-numbered years to a four-year term beginning on the following January 1. Two are elected in the year after the presidential election and one is elected in the year before it. There is also an elected township fiscal officer, who serves a four-year term beginning on April 1 of the year after the election, which is held in November of the year before the presidential election. Vacancies in the fiscal officership or on the board of trustees are filled by the remaining trustees.

References

External links
County website

Townships in Huron County, Ohio
Townships in Ohio